Isaac of Ourville ( Yiṣḥaq me-Orvil) was a medieval French rabbi, author of the as yet unpublished Menahel, a book of halakha (Jewish ritual law).

Isaac appears to have been a contemporary of Perez of Corbeil (died ); 
Isaac cites Moses of Coucy's Semag, from the generation before Perez, while segments of Isaac's Menahel are, in turn, cited alongside the Perez's teachings. 
His master was Hayyim of Blois, 
who is possibly identical with Hayyim ben Isaac the Frenchman, the author of Ez Hayyim on Jewish monetary law, a disciple of Samuel of Evreux.

Carmoly and others read  as "Orbeil", a village in the Puy-de-Dôme department, while Gross considered this unlikely, as Orbeil probably had no Jewish population in medieval times. According to Gross,  is probably Ourville (Ourville-en-Caux), Seine-Maritime, or perhaps Orville, Orne. 
Isaac is thus sometimes named  HaOrvili (or HaOrbeli). 
He was confused by Samuel David Luzzato with a similarly named rabbinical authority, Isaac ben Dorbolo, after Rapoport's misinterpretation of the latter's patronymic as "d'Orbolo".

Selections of his halakhic book, HaMenahel ( "the Guide"), were incorporated in the closely related pair of halakhic works, Orhot Hayyim by Aaron ben Jacob ha-Kohen and Kol Bo, and, anonymously, in the halakhic decisions of Menahem Recanati. 
Once considered lost, parts of the Menahel are now known to exist in manuscript.

References

13th-century French rabbis
13th-century French writers
French male writers